Gatter Island is an uninhabited island within Qikiqtaaluk Region, Nunavut, Canada. An island within an island, it is located in Lake Hazen on Ellesmere Island within Quttinirpaaq National Park. The smaller Clay Island lies off its southern shore.

References

 The Atlas of Canada

Ellesmere Island
Uninhabited islands of Qikiqtaaluk Region